Paweł Dembski was a 16th-century Polish churchman.
 
Born into the Prawdzic noble family clan about 1540AD, he was a Catholic priest, Canon, Auxiliary Bishop and Vicar General of the Diocese of Kraków. He was also Bishop of Laodicea in Phrygia.(modern Turkey).
He died on 28 February 1614 in Kraków.

References

16th-century births
1614 deaths
16th-century Polish nobility
16th-century Roman Catholic archbishops in the Polish–Lithuanian Commonwealth
Canons of Kraków